The following is a list of notable events and releases that happened in 2011 in music in South Korea.

Award shows and festivals

Award ceremonies

Festivals

Debuting and disbanded in 2011

Debuting groups

AA
APeace
Apink
B1A4
Blady
Block B
Boyfriend
Brave Girls
Busker Busker
C-REAL
Chocolat
Clover
Dal Shabet
F-ve Dolls
Geeks
Kim Heechul & Kim Jungmo
M.I.B
Myname
N-Sonic
N-Train
Rania
Sistar19
Stellar
Super Junior-D&E
Troublemaker
Ulala Session

Reformed groups
Super Junior-M
Turtles

Solo debuts

DJ Clazzi
Jieun
Jang Jin-young
Kahi
Keith Ape
Kim Jong-min
Okasian
Reddy
Zion.T

Disbanded groups

Paran
SeeYa

Releases in 2011

First quarter

January

February

March

Second quarter

April

May

June

Third quarter

July

August

September

Fourth quarter

October

November

December

Charts
List of number-one hits of 2011 (South Korea)
List of number-one albums of 2011 (South Korea)

See also
2011 in South Korea
List of South Korean films of 2011

References

 
South Korean music
K-pop